The 28th Daytime Emmy Awards were held in 2001 to commemorate excellence in daytime programming from the previous year
(2000). As the World Turns tied with General Hospital for the most Daytime Emmys  won in a single year, with a total of eight.

Winners in each category are in bold.

Outstanding Drama Series
All My Children
As the World Turns
General Hospital
The Young and the Restless

Outstanding Actor in a Drama Series
Peter Bergman (Jack Abbott, The Young and the Restless)
David Canary (Adam Chandler & Stuart Chandler, All My Children)
Tom Eplin (Jake McKinnon, As the World Turns)
Jon Hensley (Holden Snyder, As the World Turns)
John McCook (Eric Forrester, The Bold and the Beautiful)

Outstanding Actress in a Drama Series
Julia Barr (Brooke English, All My Children)
Martha Byrne (Lily Snyder & Rose D'Angelo, As the World Turns)
Susan Flannery (Stephanie Forrester, The Bold and the Beautiful)
Susan Lucci (Erica Kane, All My Children)
Marcy Walker (Liza Colby, All My Children)

Outstanding Supporting Actor in a Drama Series
Hunt Block (Craig Montgomery, As the World Turns)
Josh Duhamel (Leo du Pres, All My Children)
Benjamin Hendrickson (Hal Munson, As the World Turns)
Michael E. Knight (Tad Martin, All My Children)
Michael Park (Jack Snyder, As the World Turns)

Outstanding Supporting Actress in a Drama Series
Rebecca Budig (Greenlee Smythe, All My Children)
Lesli Kay (Molly Conlan, As the World Turns)
Cady McClain (Dixie Cooney, All My Children)
Colleen Zenk Pinter (Barbara Ryan, As the World Turns)
Maura West (Carly Snyder, As the World Turns)

Outstanding Younger Actor in a Drama Series
Josh Ryan Evans (Timmy Lenox, Passions)
David Lago (Raul Guittierez, The Young and the Restless)
Jesse McCartney (JR Chandler, All My Children)
Paul Taylor (Isaac Jenkins, As the World Turns)
David Tom (Billy Abbott, The Young and the Restless)
Justin Torkildsen (Rick Forrester, The Bold and the Beautiful)

Outstanding Younger Actress in a Drama Series
Terri Colombino (Katie Peretti, As the World Turns)
Adrienne Frantz (Amber Moore, The Bold and the Beautiful)
Annie Parisse (Julia Lindsey, As the World Turns)
Eden Riegel (Bianca Montgomery, All My Children)
Kristina Sisco (Abigail Williams, As the World Turns)

Outstanding Drama Series Writing Team
All My Children
As the World Turns
Passions
The Young and the Restless

Outstanding Drama Series Directing Team
All My Children
As the World Turns
General Hospital
Passions
The Young and the Restless

Outstanding Talk Show
Donny & Marie
Live with Regis
The Montel Williams Show
The Rosie O'Donnell Show
The View

Outstanding Talk Show Host
Rosie O'Donnell The Rosie O'Donnell Show
Regis Philbin Live With Regis
Barbara Walters, Meredith Vieira, Star Jones, Joy Behar and Lisa Ling, The View
Donny Osmond and Marie Osmond, Donny & Marie

Outstanding Game/Audience Participation Show
 Hollywood Squares
 Jeopardy!
 The Price Is Right
 Win Ben Stein's Money
 Who Wants to Be a Millionaire

Outstanding Game Show Host
 Bob Barker, The Price Is Right
 Tom Bergeron, Hollywood Squares
 Regis Philbin, Who Wants to Be a Millionaire
 Ben Stein and Jimmy Kimmel, Win Ben Stein's Money
 Alex Trebek, Jeopardy!

Outstanding Performer In An Animated Program
Nathan Lane (Spot Helperman/Scott Leadready II, Teacher's Pet)
Kel Mitchell (T-Bone, Clifford the Big Red Dog)
John Ritter (Clifford, Clifford the Big Red Dog)
Cree Summer (Cleo, Clifford the Big Red Dog)
Ruby Dee (Alice the Great, Little Bill)

Outstanding Special Class Animated Program
Paul Dini, James Tucker, Andrea Romano, Butch Lukic, Hilary Bader, Jean MacCurdy, Stan Berkowitz, Alan Burnett, Dan Riba, Bruce W. Timm, Curt Geda, Bob Goodman, Glen Murakami and Rich Fogel (Batman Beyond)
Neil Court, Steven DeNure, Joanna Ferrone, Sue Rose, Beth Stevenson, Holly Huckins, Laura McCreary, Michael Kramer, Aaron Linton, Doug Masters, Kyle Menzies and Vamberto Maduro (Angela Anaconda)
Mark McCorkle, Robert Schooley, Tad Stones, Don MacKinnon, Steve Loter, Victor Cook and Jamie Thomason (Buzz Lightyear of Star Command)
Richard Raynis, Paul Verhoeven, Jeff Kline, Audu Paden, Susan Blu, Vincent Edwards, David Hartman, Sean Song, Marsha F. Griffin, Thomas Pugsley, Greg Weisman and Greg Klein (Roughnecks: Starship Troopers Chronicles)
Andy Heyward, Robby London, Michael Maliani, Elizabeth Partyka, Judith Reilly, Phil Harnage, Sandy Ross and Paul Quinn (Sherlock Holmes in the 22nd Century)

Outstanding Music Direction and Composition
Shirley Walker, Lolita Ritmanis, Michael McCuistion and Kristopher Carter (Batman Beyond)
Paul Jacobs, Christopher Cerf, Sarah Durkee and Thomas Z. Shepard (Between the Lions)
John McDaniel (The Rosie O'Donnell Show)
Mike Renzi, Danny Epstein, Dave Conner, Christopher Cerf and Stephen Lawrence (Sesame Street)

Outstanding Sound Mixing
Clancy Livingston, Dean Okrand, Bill Thiederman and Mike Brooks (Honey, I Shrunk the Kids: The TV Show)
Susan Pelino (Journey of Dr. Dre)
Bill Baggett and Robert Montrone (Martha Stewart Living)
Stephanie Cottrell (Natureworks)
Christopher Allan and Dan Lesiw (ZOOM)

Outstanding Sound Editing - Special Class
Jennifer Mertens, Paca Thomas, Otis Van Osten, Rick Hammel, Eric Hertsguaard, Robbi Smith, Brian F. Mars, Marc S. Perlman and Dominick Certo (Buzz Lightyear of Star Command)
Robert Hargreaves, George Brooks, Gregory Beaumont, Mark Keatts, Linda Di Franco, Kelly Ann Foley and Kim Strand (Batman Beyond)
Robert Schott, Andy Erice, Christopher Fina and Brian Beatrice (Between the Lions)
Robert Duran and Roshaun Hawley (Jackie Chan Adventures)
Robert Duran, Robert Poole II and Robbi Smith (Roughnecks: The Starship Troopers Chronicles)
Robert Hargreaves and Giovanni Moscardino (X-Men: Evolution)
Rick Hinson and Elizabeth Hinson (Clifford the Big Red Dog)

Outstanding Sound Mixing - Special Class
Tom Maydeck and Robert Hargreaves (X-Men: Evolution)
Krandal Crews, Eric Freeman, Timothy Borquez, and Timothy J. Garrity (The Angry Beavers)
Stéphane Bergeron (Arthur Arthur (season 5))
John Hegedes, Robert Hargreaves and Tom Maydeck (Batman Beyond)
Blake Norton, Bob Schott and Dick Maitland (Sesame Street)

Outstanding in Live and Direct to Tape Sound Mixing
Ron Balentine, David M. Boothe and Gary French (Barney & Friends)
Basil Matychak, Al Theurer, and Keith Carroll (Who Wants to Be a Millionaire)
John Sorrento, Ethan Orlovitz, John Venable and Vann Weller (The View)
Otto Svoboda, Maryann Jorgenson, Hope Vinitsky, Bruce Buehlman and Bob La Masney (Hollywood Squares)
Ed McEwan, Bill Taylor, Jay Vicari and Marty Brumbach (The Rosie O'Donnell Show)
Joel Spector, Ed McEwan, Dick Maitland and Ed Greene (Macy's Thanksgiving Day Parade)

Outstanding Directing in a Children's Series
Jacques Laberge and Pierre Roy (Zoboomafoo)
Koyalee Chanda, Nancy Keegan and Lucy Walker (Blue's Clues)
Larry Lancit, Ed Wiseman and Kevin Lombard (Reading Rainbow)
Emily Squires, Ted May and Steve Feldman (Sesame Street)

Outstanding Children's Series
Even Stevens
Reading RainbowReal Kids, Real AdventuresBetween the LionsZoomOutstanding Performer in a Children's Series
LeVar Burton (Himself, Reading Rainbow)
Steve Burns (Steve, Blue's Clues)
Donna Pescow (Eileen Stevens, Even Stevens)
Fred Rogers (Himself, Mister Rogers' Neighborhood)
Kevin Clash (Elmo, Sesame Street)

Outstanding Performer in a Children's Special
Ossie Davis (Buck McHenry, Finding Buck McHenry)
Ellen Burstyn (Trish, Mermaid)
Jodelle Ferland (Desi, Mermaid)
Peter Falk (Abel Shaddick, A Storm in Summer) 
Alfre Woodard (Clara, The Wishing Tree'')

Lifetime achievement award
Ralph Edwards

References

External links

028
Daytime Emmy Awards

it:Premi Emmy 2001#Premi Emmy per il Daytime